Harland Miller is a writer and artist.  Born in Yorkshire, England in 1964, he studied at Chelsea School of Art, graduating in 1988 with an MA.

Miller published his first novel Slow Down Arthur, Stick to Thirty, published by Fourth Estate, to critical acclaim in 2000.  In the same year he published a novella titled At First I was Afraid, I was Petrified.  Published by Book Works, the novella is a study of obsessive compulsive disorder.  It is based on a hoard of hundreds of Polaroids found by Miller and taken by a relative of his, all of oven knobs all turned to “Off”.

Miller is probably best known for his giant canvases of Penguin Book covers.  The titles are sardonic statements about life - Whitby - The Self Catering Years, Rags to Polyester - My Story, York, So Good They Named It Once, Incurable Romantic Seeks Dirty Filthy Whore.

See also
List of British artists
List of English novelists
Miniature Museum
York Art Gallery

References

English writers
1964 births
Living people
English contemporary artists